Jack King may refer to:

Sports
Jack King (footballer, born 1985), English footballer for Scunthorpe United
Jack King (footballer, born 1879) (1879–1965), Australian footballer for St Kilda
Jack King (footballer, born 1901), English footballer
Jack King (footballer, born 1902) (1902–1988), English footballer for Oldham Athletic
Jack King (footballer, born 1904) (1904–1979), Australian footballer for Carlton
Jack King (footballer, born 1919) (1919–2012), Australian footballer for Hawthorn
Jack King (footballer, born 1928) (1928–2011), Australian footballer for Footscray
Jack King (cyclist) (1897–?), Australian Olympic cyclist
Jack King (water polo) (1910–2000), Australian Olympic water polo player

Other
Jack King (animator) (1895–1958), director and animator for Warner Bros. and Disney
Eric Roberts (spy) (1907–1972), MI5 agent known by the pseudonym Jack King
Jack P. King (1909–1982), member of the Hawaii House of Representatives
Jack King (NASA) (1931–2015), NASA's "Voice of Launch Control" during Apollo 11 and other missions
Jack Lester King (1934–1983), American population geneticist
Jack King (musician), drummer and founder of Frumious Bandersnatch

See also
John King (disambiguation)
 King (surname)